Home of Football may refer to:

 Arsenal Stadium, a former football stadium in Highbury, London, England
 The Home of Football Stadium, a proposed football stadium in Sheffield, England
 Wembley Stadium, a stadium in Wembley, London, built in place of the old Wembley Stadium
 Wembley Stadium (1923), a former football stadium in Wembley, London

See also
 The Homes of Football, a photographic exhibition by Stuart Roy Clarke